Statistics of Danish 1st Division in the 1968 season.

Overview
It was contested by 12 teams, and Kjøbenhavns Boldklub won the championship.

League standings

Results

References
Denmark - List of final tables (RSSSF)

Danish 1st Division seasons
Dan
Dan
1
Top level Danish football league seasons